The Tora is a stream in the province of Livorno, Tuscany, central Italy. It is a stretch of water from below Pisan Hills, south of the Arno Valley.

With its 29 kilometres it is the longest river that receives most of its tributaries from Livorno Hills. It leads in Scolmatore dell'Arno near  Mortaiolo.

Rivers of Italy
Rivers of Tuscany
Drainage basins of the Tyrrhenian Sea